This article provides details on candidates for the 2011 New South Wales state election, which was held on 26 March 2011.

Retiring Members

Labor
 Marie Andrews MLA (Gosford)
 John Aquilina MLA (Riverstone)
 Diane Beamer MLA (Mulgoa)
 David Campbell MLA (Keira)
 Barry Collier MLA (Miranda)
 Angela D'Amore MLA (Drummoyne)
 Tanya Gadiel MLA (Parramatta)
 Paul Gibson MLA (Blacktown)
 Kerry Hickey MLA (Cessnock)
 Phil Koperberg MLA (Blue Mountains)
 Gerard Martin MLA (Bathurst)
 Grant McBride MLA (The Entrance)
 Lylea McMahon MLA (Shellharbour)
 Alison Megarrity MLA (Menai)
 Frank Sartor MLA (Rockdale)
 Tony Stewart MLA (Bankstown)
 Joe Tripodi MLA (Fairfield)
 Graham West MLA (Campbelltown)
 Tony Catanzariti MLC
 Kayee Griffin MLC
 Christine Robertson MLC
 Ian West MLC

Liberal
 Peter Debnam MLA (Vaucluse)
 Judy Hopwood MLA (Hornsby)
 Malcolm Kerr MLA (Cronulla)
 Wayne Merton MLA (Baulkham Hills)
 Michael Richardson MLA (Castle Hill)

Nationals
 John Turner MLA (Myall Lakes)
 Russell Turner MLA (Orange)

Greens
 Ian Cohen MLC

Legislative Assembly
Sitting members are shown in bold text. Successful candidates are highlighted in the relevant colour. Where there is possible confusion, an asterisk (*) is also used.

Legislative Council
Sitting members are shown in bold text. Tickets that elected at least one MLC are highlighted in the relevant colour. Successful candidates are identified by an asterisk (*).

Unregistered parties and groups
Some parties and groups that did not qualify for registration with the New South Wales Electoral Commission nevertheless endorsed candidates, who appeared on the ballot papers as independent or unaffiliated candidates.
The Socialist Equality Party endorsed Carolyn Kennett in Auburn, Richard Phillips in Bankstown, James Cogan in Marrickville and Noel Holt in Newcastle.
The Democratic Labor Party endorsed Boutros Zalloua in East Hills, Simon McCaffrey in Macquarie Fields and Emily Dunn in Mulgoa.
The Australian Sex Party endorsed Andrew Patterson in Sydney and Huw Campbell in the Legislative Council.
The Australia First Party endorsed Tony Robinson in Mulgoa and Tony Pettitt in Riverstone.
The Australian Protectionist Party endorsed Nicholas Folkes in Balmain.
The Social Justice Network endorsed co-founder Jamal Daoud in Auburn, Ahmad Al-Yasiry in Fairfield, and Omar Quiader in Lakemba.
The Communist League endorsed Linda Harris in Fairfield and Robert Aiken in Parramatta.
Rod Noble in Newcastle was the national president of the Progressive Labour Party.
The Australian Progress Party, which advocates abolition of the states, endorsed Bruce Manefield in the Legislative Council.
"Help Fix NSW" endorsed Robert Peake in the Legislative Council.
"United We Stand" endorsed Michelle Meares in Terrigal and Ben Smith in the Legislative Council.
Independent Legislative Council candidate John Hatton endorsed independent candidates for the Legislative Assembly under the name "John Hatton's Independent Team". These candidates were Alex Elliott in Drummoyne, Robert Parker in Goulburn, Greg Petty in Heathcote, Kellie Tranter in Maitland, Michael McDermott in Parramatta, Richard McGovern in Oxley, Joe McGirr in Wagga Wagga and Judy Hannan in Wollondilly.
Independent federal MP Rob Oakeshott endorsed Steve Attkins in Myall Lakes, Richard McGovern in Oxley and Tim Duddy in Upper Hunter.

References
New South Wales Electoral Commission (2011). Candidates

2011